Gösta Karlsson is a retired Swedish footballer. Karlsson was part of the Djurgården Swedish champions' team of 1912. Karlsson made 22 Svenska Serien appearances for Djurgården and scored 2 goals.

Honours

Club 
 Djurgårdens IF 
 Svenska Mästerskapet: 1912

References

Swedish footballers
Djurgårdens IF Fotboll players
Svenska Serien players
Association footballers not categorized by position
Year of birth missing